Marie-Victoire Lemoine (1754 – 2 December 1820) was a French classicist painter.

Life 
Born in Paris, Marie-Victoire Lemoine was the eldest daughter of four sisters to Charles Lemoine and Marie-Anne Rousselle. Her sisters, Marie-Denise Villers and Marie-Élisabeth Gabiou, also became painters. She was first cousins with Jeanne-Elisabeth Chaudet through her mother's side. Unlike her sisters, she remained unmarried and became one of the few women in contemporary art that made a living through painting.

She was a student of François-Guillaume Ménageot in the early 1770s, with whom she lived and worked in a house acquired by the art dealer Jean-Baptiste-Pierre Lebrun, next to the studio of Élisabeth-Louise Vigée-Le Brun (1755–1842), France's leading woman painter. Ménageot was ten years older than Lemoine. From 1779, Marie-Victoire Lemoine lived in her parents' home until she moved in with her sister Marie-Elisabeth, where she remained even after her sister's death. She died six years after her last exhibition, aged sixty-six. At the time of her death, she only left 10 Francs in cash and clothing and linen valued at 181 Francs and 50 Centimes, which amounts to only US$ in cash and US$ for the clothing and linen in today's currency.

Work 
Marie-Victoire Lemoine mainly painted portraits, miniatures, and genre scenes. She was most active in the art community during the late 1780s and the early 1790s. Lemoine set up her first salon in 1774. She took part in numerous Salons, for example, her first solo exhibition was held at Pahin de la Blancherie's Salon de Correspondance in 1779, where she exhibited a now untraced portrait of the Princess Lamballe (57 x 45 cm). Five years after the Parisian Salon allowed women to participate, she exhibits there for the first time in 1796. She continued to display her works of art to the public in the salons of 1796, 1798, 1799, 1802, 1804, and 1814. Lemoine was known to sign her paintings with the signature "M. Vic Lemoine."

References

French women painters
1754 births
1820 deaths
Painters from Paris
18th-century French painters
18th-century French women artists
19th-century French painters
19th-century French women artists